SS William Crane Gray was a Liberty ship built in the United States during World War II. She was named after William Crane Gray, the first bishop of the Episcopal Church's Missionary Jurisdiction of Southern Florida.

Construction
William Crane Gray was laid down on 23 May 1944, under a Maritime Commission (MARCOM) contract, MC hull 2485, by the St. Johns River Shipbuilding Company, Jacksonville, Florida; sponsored by Mrs. Louie W. Strum, the niece of the namesake, and was launched on 12 July 1944.

History
She was allocated to the International Freigting Corp., on 27 July 1944. On 29 May 1948, she was laid up in the National Defense Reserve Fleet, Wilmington, North Carolina. On 27 May 1952, she was laid up in the National Defense Reserve Fleet, Beaumont, Texas. She was sold for scrapping, 1 May 1972, to Luria Brothers and Co., for $40,333.33. She was removed from the fleet, 21 July 1972.

References

Bibliography

 
 
 
 

 

Liberty ships
Ships built in Jacksonville, Florida
1944 ships
Wilmington Reserve Fleet
Beaumont Reserve Fleet